Max Huang (born September 22, 1988) is a German actor, martial artist, stunt performer, songwriter and singer. He is known for his role of Kung Lao in the 2021 Mortal Kombat reboot, and for being a member of the Jackie Chan Stunt Team.

Personal life
Max was born in Germany of Chinese-Indonesian father and German mother. He started in the movie industry as a member of the Jackie Chan Stunt Team, as stunt performer and coordinator; he has worked in films like Police Story 2013, The Foreigner and Matthew Vaughn's Kingsman: The Secret Service. He has practiced Wushu under Shanghai Wushu Team member Wang Peng Cheng and won Gold at The German Wushu Nationals in 2009.

In 2021, he was part of the main cast in Mortal Kombat in the role of  Kung Lao. The film is a reboot of the video game franchise of the same name.

In April 2021, he debuted as singer releasing his first single Flawless Victory. The song was composed and written by Huang, and produced by Vincent Lee.
Huang also directed and starred the song's music video, released on April 22.

Filmography

Film

Music videos

References

External links

Chinese male film actors
Living people
1988 births
Chinese male television actors 
21st-century Chinese male actors